Li Yitong (born September 6, 1990) is a Chinese actress and singer. She is best known for her roles as Wan Mei, an assassin in the 2018 Chinese television series Bloody Romance,  Huang Rong in The Legend of the Condor Heroes (2017 TV series),  Lu Wenxi (Abao) in the 2019 Chinese television series Royal Nirvana,  and Fu Rou in the 2021 Chinese television series Court Lady.

Early life and education
Li Yitong started dancing when she was almost ten by taking amateur-level classes. Under the recommendation of a teacher, she later applied and was admitted to the Shenzhen Art School at the age of 12. She received her bachelor degree from the Beijing Dance Academy, China's leading dance institution, where she majored in folk dance. Prior to becoming an actress, Li wanted to start a business of tea house into which she could merge elements of dance performance. But after once helping out her friends in film school for a microcinema, she was fascinated and decided to pursue a career in acting.

Career
In 2016, Li made her acting debut with a leading role in the period fantasy web series Demon Girl by Yu Zheng. 

In 2017, she played Huang Rong in the television adaptation of Jin Yong's wuxia novel Legend of the Condor Heroes and rose to fame in China. 

In 2018, Li starred in the wuxia romance web series Bloody Romance, playing the lead role of an assassin named Wan Mei. She also recorded one of the drama's theme songs. The series was a major commercial success and passed 600 million views online by August 2018. The same year, she made her big-screen debut in the comedy film Keep Calm and Be a Superstar. 

In 2019, Li starred in the period romance drama Blossom in Heart alongside Deng Lun, historical political drama Royal Nirvana alongside Luo Jin, and wuxia drama Sword Dynasty alongside Li Xian. 

In 2020, Li starred in fantasy romance film Love You Forever, and modern romance drama Don't Think Twice, Love's All Right alongside Chen Jianbin.

In 2021, she starred in the fantasy romance drama Court Lady, playing the female lead role Fu Rou, a seamstress.

Filmography

Film

Television series

Discography

Singles

Awards and nominations

References

External links 
 
 

1990 births
Living people
Chinese television actresses
Chinese film actresses
21st-century Chinese actresses
Actresses from Shandong
Beijing Dance Academy alumni